The Recean Cabinet is the Cabinet of Moldova, led by former Interior Minister Dorin Recean since 16 February 2023.

Composition

References 

 

Moldova cabinets
2023 establishments in Moldova
Cabinets established in 2023